Lokendra Singh (15 December 1976 – 21 February 2018) was an Indian politician and a member of the 16th Legislative Assembly of Uttar Pradesh of India.  He born in Sahaspur zone and represented the Noorpur constituency of Uttar Pradesh and was a member of the Bharatiya Janata Party political party.

Early life and education
Lokendra Singh was born in Sahaspur, Uttar Pradesh. He held Master of Arts degree from Bareilly College (M. J. P. Rohilkhand University). Before being elected as MLA, he used to work as an agriculturist.

Controversy
On 12 August 2017, a case was filed against Singh, his brother, and a former Samajwadi Party MLA for allegedly illegally detaining a farmer who died after being tortured.

Death
Singh died on 21 February 2018 in a traffic collision at the age of 41.

Posts held

See also
Bharatiya Janata Party
Government of India
Noorpur
Politics of India
Sahaspur

Sahaspur
Uttar Pradesh Legislative Assembly

References 

1976 births
2018 deaths
Bharatiya Janata Party politicians from Uttar Pradesh
People from Bijnor district
Uttar Pradesh MLAs 2012–2017
Uttar Pradesh MLAs 2017–2022
Road incident deaths in India
Accidental deaths in India